The Hippodrome de Maisons-Laffitte at 1 avenue de la Pelouse in the northwestern Parisian suburb of Maisons-Laffitte in France was a turf horse racing facility and track for Thoroughbred flat racing. Opened in 1878 by Joseph Oller, inventor of the pari-mutuel machine, it sits on 92 hectares that belonged to the wealthy banker Jacques Laffitte.

The nearby Château de Maisons-Laffitte is home to The Museum of the Racehorse.

In November 2018 France Galop announced that the racecourse would close at the end of 2019 due to financial pressures on the organisation.  The final meeting was held on 29th October 2019.  Despite the efforts of local government officials there are no plans to re-open the track and the racing surface has been allowed fall into disrepair.  

The racecourse layout was unique as it was one of the few courses in the world that staged both left- and right-handed races. It also featured a 2,000-metre straight track, one of the longest in Europe and three different winning posts.

From early March through to the end of November, the major annual Conditions races at Hippodrome de Maisons-Laffitte were:
 Prix Eugène Adam
 Prix Robert Papin
 Prix Messidor
 La Coupe de Maisons-Laffitte
 Prix Eclipse
 Prix de Seine-et-Oise
 Critérium de Maisons-Laffitte
 Prix Miesque

References

External links
 France Galop website for Hippodrome de Maisons-Laffitte (French language)

 
Sports venues completed in 1878
Maisons
Maisons
Buildings and structures in Yvelines